Bianca Farriol (born ) is an Argentine volleyball player. She is part of the Argentina women's national volleyball team. She competed at the 2020 Summer Olympics.

Career 
She participated in the 2018 FIVB Volleyball Women's Nations League.

References

External links 

 FIVB profile
 http://japan2018.fivb.com/en/news/argentinian-women-called-up-for-2018?id=73671

2001 births
Living people
Argentine women's volleyball players
Place of birth missing (living people)
Middle blockers
Volleyball players at the 2020 Summer Olympics
Olympic volleyball players of Argentina